The University of Nevada, Las Vegas (UNLV) is a public land-grant research university in Paradise, Nevada. It was formerly part of the University of Nevada from 1957 to 1969. It includes the Shadow Lane Campus, just east of the University Medical Center of Southern Nevada, which houses both School of Medicine and School of Dental Medicine. UNLV's law school, the William S. Boyd School of Law, is the only law school in the state.

It is classified among "R1: Doctoral Universities – Very high research activity". According to the National Science Foundation, UNLV spent $83 million on research and development in 2018, ranking it 165th in the nation.

History
The first college classes, which eventually became the classes of UNLV, were offered as the southern regional extension division of the University of Nevada, in 1959 in a classroom at Las Vegas High School. In 1955, State Senator Mahlon Brown "sponsored the legislation to provide $200,000 to construct the campus's first building" – Frazier Hall. Groundbreaking on the original  site was in April 1956, and the university purchased a  site in North Las Vegas for future expansion. UNLV was officially founded by the Nevada Board of Regents as the Southern Division of the University of Nevada on September 10, 1957. The first classes were held on the current campus in the post and beam Mid Century Modern Maude Frazier Hall designed by the local architectural firm, Zick & Sharp. Twenty-nine students graduated in the first commencement ceremonies in 1964.

In 1965, the Nevada Legislature named the school Nevada Southern University, and the Board of Regents hired the campus's first president, Donald C. Moyer, who died in 2008 at the age of 88.

In 1968, Nevada Southern was given equal status with its parent institution in Reno, and the present name was approved by the regents in January 1969, during a winter session and without the need of input from representatives from the University of Nevada, Reno. During this time, Nevada Southern University also adopted the southern "Rebel" athletics moniker and a mascot dressed in a southern Confederate uniform named Beauregard. The popular reasoning behind such a controversial moniker and mascot is that they did it to oppose the northern Union traditions and symbols of their northern rival, the University of Nevada. Soon, protests from NSU/UNLV students forced a slight change to their Confederate mascot, but the "Rebels" moniker remains to this day. Since its founding, the university has grown rapidly, expanding both its academic programs and campus facilities.

In 1969, the board of regents approved the name University of Nevada, Las Vegas and the abbreviation UNLV.

In 1973, Jerry Tarkanian was hired as the men's basketball coach by UNLV's second president, Roman Zorn.

The Center for Business and Economic Research  was established in 1975 for research projects that assist in the development of the Nevada economy and assist state and local agencies and private-sector enterprises in the collection and analysis of economic and market data.

In 1981, Claes Oldenburg's Flashlight sculpture was installed on the plaza between Artemus Ham Hall and Judy Bayley Theatre.

The Lied Institute for Real Estate Studies was established in 1989.

In 2001, Lied Library officially opened to the public on January 8, at a final cost of $55.3 million.

In 2002, the School of Dental Medicine opened to train students, and to offer low-cost dental care to residents.

In 2003, the Institute for Security Studies was established to address homeland security concerns. The Lynn Bennett Childhood Development Center opened.

In 2004, UNLV opened its first regional campus on Shadow Lane, near the University Medical Center.  The School of Dental Medicine is located on the Shadow Lane Campus. Also, the School of Public Health was established in the Division of Health Sciences to address new and emerging public-health issues.

In 2005, construction began on the $113 million science and engineering building, which has 200,000 square feet of teaching space, laboratories, and high-tech conference rooms. The building, completed in 2008, was designed to support interdisciplinary research; draw students to high-demand fields such as electrical engineering, computer science, and environmental science; and attract national and international researchers. UNLV launched its first comprehensive campaign, Invent the Future, with the goal of raising $500 million by December 2008. Also, the Air Force ROTC program was established on campus.

In 2006, The Nevada System of Higher Education Board of Regents raised the minimum GPA to 3.0 for admittance to UNLV. UNLV opened its first international campus in Singapore, where the William F. Harrah College of Hotel Administration offered a bachelor's degree program in hospitality management. UNLV planned to end its partnership with the Singapore Institute of Technology by 2015, due to economic issues such as rising tuition in Las Vegas and the falling value of the U.S. dollar in Singapore.

In 2007, an expanded student union (with study and social lounges, eateries, a new ballroom and a 300-seat theater) and a new student recreation center (with high-tech weight and fitness rooms, swimming pools, and a juice bar) opened in the fall. These facilities reflected UNLV's goal of becoming more student-centered. The Greenspun College of Urban Affairs broke ground for the $94 million Greenspun Hall, which showcased the latest environmental and technological advancements and served as an anchor for "Midtown UNLV."

In 2011, UNLV's business college was formally renamed after a $15 million donation from the Ted and Doris Lee family, the Las Vegas real estate, hotel, restaurant, and casino investors.

In 2016, UNLV hosted the final presidential debate between Hillary Clinton and Donald Trump. The Hank Greenspun School of Journalism and Media Studies covered the debate on their local station UNLV-TV. This featured a three-hour-live broadcast of round-table student commentary, interviews, and coverage from the spin room inside the Thomas and Mack Center.

In 2017, UNLV shut down the only HIV clinic for children and pregnant women in Southern Nevada region for ethical violations. UNLV later settled for $1.45 million related to improper charges made by principal investigator Echezona Ezeanolue to several federal research awards.

In 2018, UNLV President Len Jessup had received unfavorable performance reviews from the system chancellor. Ethical concerns were raised when a $14 million donation was conditioned on his continual employment, but the UNLV Foundation Board of Trustees conducted an ethics investigation that uncovered no self-dealings by Jessup and the donor.

In 2019, UNLV renamed the School of Community Health Sciences as the School of Public Health.

Organization
UNLV offers more than 350 bachelor's, master's, and doctoral degrees in varying fields, which are taught by 850 faculty members.

Academic schools, colleges and divisions:

Black Mountain Institute
The Black Mountain Institute (BMI) is a literary center at the university. It focuses on "live experiences, fellowships, innovative media, and literary activism".

Research
UNLV research and economic development activities increased for the fourth consecutive year, according to the fiscal-year-end report from the Division of Research and Economic Development. Research awards rose by 7.5 percent to nearly $34.5 million, and proposals increased by two percent. Research expenditures in FY18 totaled $37 million.

The College of Sciences received the largest amount of award funding among the colleges once again this fiscal year: nearly $15 million through more than 100 awards. Engineering followed with roughly $7.6 million in awards. The College of Education posted the largest percentage gain in award funding in FY16 with a nearly 47% increase from $1,776,332 in FY15 to $2,609,366 in FY16.

UNLV's economic development activities continue to grow. Sixty-one patents were filed in FY16, an increase of 17% over FY15, and licensing revenue doubled from $126,242 in FY15 to $252,309 in FY16.

Another measure of university research activity is the number of doctoral degrees conferred, as doctoral programs require a strong research component culminating in the doctoral dissertation. UNLV doctoral conferrals increased nearly 13% in FY16 to 166 degrees conferred. For the 2017–2018 school year, 163 doctoral degrees were conferred.

Academics

Undergraduate admissions

UNLV's admissions process is considered "selective" according to U.S. News & World Report. For freshmen entering fall 2018, 9,527 were accepted out of 11,613 applicants, and 3,947 enrolled. Women constituted 57.9% of the incoming class; men were 42.1%.

Among freshman students who enrolled in fall 2016, SAT scores for the middle 50% ranged from 450 to 560 for critical reading, 450–570 for math, and 430–540 for writing. ACT composite scores for the middle 50% ranged from 19 to 24. In terms of class rank, 20% of enrolled freshmen were in the top 10% of their high school classes; 52% ranked in the top quarter, and 82% ranked in the top half. The average high school grade point average was 3.31.

Rankings

According to the QS World University Rankings, William F. Harrah College of Hospitality's Hotel Administration program is ranked No. 2 in the world in 2020.

Lee Business School's part-time MBA program is ranked in the top 28% in U.S. News & World Report's 2014 ranking of best business graduate programs.

The Atlantic recognized UNLV's English department as having one of the nation's most innovative master of fine arts programs and one of the top-five doctoral programs in creative writing.

Down Beat magazine, the internationally recognized industry standard trade publication for jazz music, recognized the work of the 2010 UNLV Jazz Ensemble as "Outstanding Large Jazz Ensemble Performance" among graduate college-level jazz bands in their annual Student Music Award issue of that year.

In 2018, UNLV surpassed New York University as the most diverse university for undergraduates according to U.S. News & World Report.

Student life

Much of the student life at UNLV revolves around its Student Union, which houses the offices for its student government and student organizations on its third floor.

Student government
The Consolidated Students of the University of Nevada, Las Vegas (CSUN) is the undergraduate student government at UNLV.  This body consists of an executive board, a senate of 25 members from all of the colleges at UNLV, a judicial council, and directors who plan and organize events and marketing.  CSUN currently has an annual budget of about $1 million, funded through student fees.  The senate ways and means committee determines how the CSUN budget will be divided or set aside for items such as student organization funding and scholarships.  The final say on spending in CSUN is the senate.

Together with UNLV, CSUN founded an on-campus preschool in 1974 as part of the College of Education.  Both students and staff can use this accredited preschool.

The graduate student government at UNLV, called The Graduate and Professional Student Association, is separate from the undergraduate student government.

Student organizations
UNLV has over 350 student organizations. To become official, the organization must become recognized by UNLV's Involvement Center.

Newspaper
The Scarlet and Gray Free Press is the student newspaper on campus.  It covers many topics about higher education in UNLV and the state.  The paper extensively covers CSUN senate meetings and elections.  It is printed twice weekly and posts its articles online. Recently, the newspaper's name was changed from Rebel Yell to its current iteration, as the former title was criticized for its reference to Confederate culture.

Greek life

Campus

The main campus of UNLV is on 332-acres in centrally located Paradise, Nevada.

Midtown UNLV is an ongoing private-public development along Maryland Parkway, a border street to the school. Development began in 2002 and its purpose is to expand the university to meet the demands of a major university in the Las Vegas metropolitan area. The project to improve the "front door" of the university by improving amenities for students and businesses along Maryland Parkway. The goals are to reduce vacant spaces, lower business turnover rates, and create space for the university to expand. Additionally, the project aims to create new housing developments close to campus. Major funding is through state funding sources along with private donations.

Sustainability
The University of Nevada, Las Vegas has created an Urban Sustainability Initiative that strives to implement sustainable practices on campus and in the larger Las Vegas community. In addition to having two campus buildings in the process of LEED Silver Certification and one building in the process of LEED Gold Certification, UNLV has reduced its use of electricity and natural gas by 38% per square foot since 2001 by retrofitting older campus buildings. In the 2009 edition of the Sustainable Endowment Institute's College Sustainability Report Card, University of Nevada-Las Vegas received a grade of "C".

The Science and Engineering building received a LEED Silver rating in March 2009. SEB achieved this rating by using recycled glass, steel, concrete, and wood. More than 60% of the leftover construction materials were recycled. The roof of SEB was made to reflect 92% of sunlight. This reduces the amount of heat absorbed into the building, so reduces energy needed to cool the building. Incoming air to SEB is also cooled through evaporation so the need for air conditioning is reduced. High-performance window glazing also allows light to come in while keeping the building insulated. Occupancy sensors allow lights to automatically turn off when a room is not occupied, saving electricity. Low-flow sinks, toilets, and showers, as well as a drip irrigation system for the native desert landscape, reduce water usage by 42%. SEB also uses a reclaimed water system that captures wastewater, providing 750 gallons of water a day that are used to flush toilets.

The Greenspun College of Urban Affairs building of UNLV received a LEED Gold rating in April 2010.

In 2009, UNLV received the Cashman Good Government Award for the campus' sustainability measures for "maintaining consistent energy costs despite substantial campus growth," saving nearly $11 million from 2001 to 2009. UNLV was also recognized for managing the xeric demonstration garden and for its recycling efforts.

Recent efforts by the university to improve sustainability practices include participation in the Solar Decathlon and creation of a Sustainability Coordinator position to investigate methods for improving sustainability of residence halls.

Residence halls
Four residence-hall complexes are on the campus: Dayton Complex, Tonopah Complex, South Residential Complex, and Upper Class Complex.

Libraries
UNLV has several libraries on the main campus. The biggest is the Lied Library in the center of campus.

Many colleges also have their individual libraries that hold materials more closely related to the college:

 The Architecture Studies Library in the UNLV School of Architecture
 The Teacher Development & Resources Library in the College of Education
 The Music Library in the Lee & Thomas Beam Music Center
 The Wiener-Rogers Law Library in the William S. Boyd School of Law

Athletic facilities
UNLV's main athletic facilities include Thomas & Mack Center (1983), Cox Pavilion, Buchanan Natatorium, Earl Wilson Stadium, and Allegiant Stadium. These facilities hold home games for UNLV sports programs and have hosted events such as the Mountain West Conference basketball tournament and the National Finals Rodeo.

In 2007, the  recreation center was completed. It caters to the needs of UNLV students' physical and mental health.

The Mendenhall Center, a training center dedicated for the UNLV basketball program, opened in 2012. The Fertitta Football Complex for UNLV Football opened in 2019.

Other notable buildings
Performing arts facilities include the Judy Bayley Theatre (1972), the Artemus W. Ham Concert Hall (1976), the Black Box Theatre, the Alta Ham Fine Arts Complex (1982), and the Lee and Thomas Beam Music Center (2001).

In 1997, the Paul B. Sogg Architecture Building opened.

In 2007, a new  student union was opened. This building offers many amenities for students including a social atmosphere, a diverse food court, conference rooms, a game room, student government offices, and student organization offices.

One of the newer buildings on campus, the Greenspun Hall, opened its doors in 2008. Home to the Greenspun College of Urban Affairs and the Brookings Mountain West Institute, this five-story, 120,000-square-foot building is home to state-of-the art media facilities. It also houses the campus radio station KUNV-FM, student-run HD2 radio station, and the television production organization UNLV-TV. Certified under the LEEDrating system, the building was named after Las Vegas Sun founder and publisher Hank Greenspun. The Greenspun family also donated $37 million to the total cost of the building.

In 2008, the Science and Engineering Building opened. It was created to serve both the College of Sciences and the Howard R. Hughes College of Engineering in an environmentally friendly manner.

Athletics

UNLV supports varsity teams in 16 different sports. The men's basketball team is referred to as the Runnin' Rebels and the men's baseball team is referred to as the Hustlin' Rebels. The Rebels are a founding member of the Mountain West Conference, in the NCAA's Division I. The only exceptions are the UNLV men's soccer team and swim and dive team, which compete in the Western Athletic Conference.

The school's official colors of scarlet and gray can be traced to 1958, when UNLV adopted as mascot a wolf wearing a Confederate uniform. Scarlet and gray were traditional colors of the Confederacy with its gray uniforms and red-based flag. UNLV's mascot is Hey Reb!, the toned-down version of the original mascot named Beauregard, which was a wolf character dressed in Confederate hat and uniform. UNLV's Hey Reb mascot made his debut in 1983. He received his first makeover in 1997 and second in 2009. Named one of 12 All-American Mascots, he competed for the title of 2004 Capital One Mascot of the Year and made a strong showing by coming in second in online voting. No stranger to national television, Hey Reb has also appeared in two memorable ESPN SportsCenter commercials.

UNLV's mascot is based on the university's split from their literal Northern rival, University of Nevada (Reno) and not on any direct reference to the actual Confederacy. As UNLV was once a Southern campus of the University of Nevada (Reno) when it became its own university, UNLV was seen as literally the South splitting from the North. UNLV had been seen as the little brother to UNR for quite some time even though Las Vegas has always been the more densely populated city of the two. Thus, the University of Nevada (Reno) Wolf mascot was dressed as a confederate soldier in UNLV colors and made the UNLV mascot as a Rebel to the UNR Wolf Pack which became the main rival of UNLV. The original basketball center court with the wolf mascot is still at the center of campus today.  This story is relayed to incoming Freshman during Freshman orientation.

On June 16, 2020, amid protests of racial inequality related to the murder of George Floyd, UNLV announced the removal of the Hey Reb! statue in front of the Tam Alumni Center, stating: "In recent conversations with the donor we mutually agreed it was best to remove the statue and return it." The university's president Marta Meana clarified the decision: "Over the past few months, I have had discussions with multiple individuals and stakeholder groups from campus and the community on how best the university can move forward given recent events throughout our nation".

UNLV has many traditions in its athletic programs. Each year, the men's football team plays the Nevada Wolf Pack in a football game called the Battle for Nevada. The trophy for that game is the Fremont Cannon. Built by the Kennecott Copper Corp., Nevada Mines Division, the cannon is valued at more than $10,000 and is considered one of the best and loudest, symbols of rivalry in college football. The cannon was permanently silenced in 2000, when Rebel players and fans accidentally dropped the trophy during a victory celebration. Since then, the teams continue the tradition with the victor painting the Fremont Cannon with the inscription of "University of Notta Lotta Victories" or "University of Northern Rejects". UNLV trails Nevada in the series 28–18 after losing the 2020 game at Allegiant Stadium with a score of 31–19.

UNLV is most known for its men's basketball program. Made famous by Coach Jerry Tarkanian in the 1970s–1990s, the Runnin' Rebels are the third-most winning team in Division I basketball history by percentage, only behind Kentucky and North Carolina (.713, 1037–418 through 2008). The UNLV team is well known for their 1990 NCAA Men's Division I Basketball Championship by defeating Duke University 103–73, which was and still is the largest margin of victory in a championship game. In that same game, UNLV became the first team to break 100 points in a championship game.

UNLV is also known for its golf program. Led by coach Dwaine Knight, the UNLV golf program has turned out PGA Tour pros such as Adam Scott, Chris Riley, Chad Campbell, Ryan Moore, Skip Kendall, Charlie Hoffman, Bill Lunde, Andres Gonzales, and Garrick Higgo. They won the NCAA Division I Men's National Golf Championship in 1998.
In February 2011, the Rebel men's swimming and diving team won their seventh-straight Mountain West Conference titles. Three Rebel swimmers competed in the 2008 Beijing Olympics; Joe Bartoch and Richard Hortness represented Canada and Jonas Anderson represented Sweden.

Notable people

Faculty
Notable faculty include:
Rita Deanin Abbey (1930-2021)
David B. Ashley (b. 1951)
John Boehner (b. 1949)
Shani Boianjiu (b. 1987)
Felicia F. Campbell (1931–2020)
Maile Chapman
Clarence Gilyard (1955-2022)
Kenny Guinn (1936–2010)
Carol Harter (b. 1941)
Hans-Hermann Hoppe (b. 1949)
Michel Hugo (1930–2010)
Len Jessup
Claudia Keelan
Lawrence L. Larmore
Robert Maxson (b. 1936)
Harry Reid (b. 1939)
Donald Revell (b. 1954)
Murray Rothbard (1926–1995)
Brian Sandoval (b. 1963)
Cathy Scott (c. 1950)
Neal Smatresk (b. 1951)
Wole Soyinka (b. 1934)
Randall Stout (1958–2014)
Dina Titus (b. 1950)
Michael Tylo (1948–2021)
Douglas A. Unger (b. 1952)
Richard Wiley (b. 1944)
Derek Walcott

Alumni

UNLV has seen many of its former students go on to local and national prominence. This includes many athletes who have excelled at the collegiate and professional levels.
Greg Anthony (b. 1967)
Joel Anthony (b. 1982)
Stacey Augmon (b. 1968)
Anthony Bennett (b. 1993)
Brian Boehringer (b. 1969), pitcher for the New York Yankees
Chad Campbell (b. 1974)
 Ben Carter (b. 1994)
 Ryan Claridge (b. 1981)
Randall Cunningham (b. 1963)
Cecil Fielder (b. 1963)
Joe Hawley (b. 1988)
Larry Johnson (b. 1969)
Ryan Ludwick (b. 1978)
Shawn Marion (b. 1978)
Keenan McCardell (b. 1970)
Efren Navarro (b. 1986)
Ryan Reeves (b. 1981)
Adam Scott (b. 1980)
Reggie Theus (b. 1957)
Matt Williams (b. 1965)
Ickey Woods (b. 1966)
Shaquille Murray-Lawrence (b. 1993)

Former Rebels in the entertainment world include:
Chris Cox, Grammy Award nominated record producer and DJ
Tabitha and Napoleon D'umo, Emmy Award-winning choreographers
Guy Fieri (b. 1968), chef, restaurateur, and Food Network star
Ginger Fish (b. 1965), band member of Marilyn Manson
Brian Garth (b. 1979), sound engineer, producer, songwriter and guitarist for American rock band Black Camaro
Ryan Higa (b. 1990), YouTube personality
Jimmy Kimmel (b. 1967), actor, comedian and late-night talk show host of Jimmy Kimmel Live!
Suge Knight (b. 1965), entrepreneur and CEO of Death Row Records, also played football at UNLV
Tomi Lahren (b. 1992), American conservative political commentator and former host of the show "Tomi" for TheBlaze
Bryan Le (b. 1996), YouTube personality
Kenny Mayne (b. 1959), ESPN sports journalist
Tom Miller (b. 1976), artist, singer, and songwriter for American rock band Black Camaro
Ronnie Vannucci (b. 1976), drummer for the American rock band The Killers
Eric Whitacre (b. 1970), Grammy Award-winning composer and conductor
Anthony E. Zuiker (b. 1968), creator and executive producer of the CSI television series franchise
Dan "Tito" Davis (b. 1953), international fugitive and author

UNLV has also produced politicians, including:
 Irene Bustamante Adams (b. 1968), former Nevada State Assemblywoman
 Nelson Araujo (b. 1987), former Nevada State Assemblyman
 Bob Beers (b. 1959), former Las Vegas City Councilman, former Nevada State Senator and former Nevada State Assemblyman
 Shelley Berkley (b. 1951), former U.S. Representative
 James Bilbray (1938–2021), former U.S. Representative
 Nicole Cannizzaro (b. 1983), Nevada State Senator
 Zach Conine (b. 1981), Nevada State Treasurer
 John Ensign (b. 1958), former U.S. Senator and former U.S. Representative
 Edgar Flores (b. 1986), Nevada State Assemblyman
 Lucy Flores (b. 1979), former Nevada State Assemblywoman
 Jason Frierson (b. 1970), Nevada State Assemblyman
 Chris Giunchigliani (b. 1954), former Vice Chair of the Clark County Commission and former Nevada State Assemblywoman
 Carolyn Goodman (b. 1939), Mayor of Las Vegas
 Gregory Hafen II, Nevada State Assemblyman
 Scott Hammond (b. 1966), Nevada State Senator and former Nevada State Assemblyman
 Mark Hutchison (b. 1963), former Lieutenant Governor of Nevada and former Nevada State Senator
 Sandra Jauregui (b. 1983), Nevada State Assemblywoman
 Ruben Kihuen (b. 1980), former U.S. Representative, former Nevada State Senator and former Nevada State Assemblyman
 Joe Lombardo (b. 1962), Governor of Nevada, former Sheriff of Clark County
 Marilyn Dondero Loop (b. 1951), Nevada State Senator and former Nevada State Assemblywoman
 James Ohrenschall (b. 1972), Nevada State Senator and former Nevada State Assemblyman
 David Parks (b. 1943), Nevada State Senator and former Nevada State Assemblyman
 Keith Pickard (b. 1962), Nevada State Senator
 David Roger (b. 1961), former Clark County District Attorney
 Steve Sisolak (b. 1953), Governor of Nevada and former Chair of the Clark County Commission
 Kim Wallin (b. 1956), former Nevada State Controller
 Joyce Woodhouse (b. 1944), Nevada State Senator
 Bill Young (b. 1956), former Sheriff of Clark County

Other notable alumni include:
 Francis J. Beckwith (b. 1960), Christian philosopher
 George J. Maloof, Jr. (b. 1964), President of Maloof Hotels and former owner of the Sacramento Kings
 Danny Tarkanian (b. 1961), attorney, businessman, perennial candidate and son of former basketball head coach Jerry Tarkanian
 Justin Favela (b. 1986), Mixed-Media Artist

Gallery

References

External links

Notes 

 
1957 establishments in Nevada
University of Nevada, Las Vegas
University of Nevada, Las Vegas
Educational institutions established in 1957
Nevada System of Higher Education
University of Nevada, Las Vegas
Schools of informatics
Universities and colleges accredited by the Northwest Commission on Colleges and Universities
Universities and colleges in Clark County, Nevada
University of Nevada, Las Vegas